The Raven Project is a 1995 science fiction action video game developed by Cryo Interactive . for MS-DOS. A port to the PlayStation console was released in 1997.

Plot 
In the distant future, humanity has been enslaved by an alien people and is on the verge of extinction. The player embodies a pilot who joins the human rebellion, hoping to finally push back the invader.

Gameplay 
The Raven Project is a space combat game in the lineage of Star Wars: Rebel Assault from LucasArts released two years earlier. The player controls different gears (spaceships, ground combat robots) in subjective view: the screen displays the cockpit of the craft and the main commands are at the bottom of the screen. The player moves in various environments and must complete a series of missions. The missions are introduced by cinematic scenes shot with real actors.

Reception 
IGN felt the game contained "crappy FMV nonsense". Electric Play thought while the game had a good concept at its core, it was let down by bad execution. Russian technology site Itkvariat thought the game won the hearts and minds of space shooter connoisseurs.

References

External links 

1995 video games
Alien invasions in video games
Cryo Interactive games
DOS games
PlayStation (console) games
Space combat simulators
Video games developed in France

Video games set in the future
Mindscape games